Pathology is a medical field specializing in the categorization of diseases. Pathological is the adjective form of the term.
 
Pathology may also refer to:

In science 
 Anatomic pathology, the study of macro and microscopic abnormalities in tissues and cells.
 Clinical pathology, medical specialty that is concerned with the diagnosis of disease based on the laboratory analysis of bodily fluids, such as blood, urine
AP/CP stands for combined anatomical and clinical pathology.
 Pathological (mathematics), any mathematical phenomenon considered atypically bad or counterintuitive
 Pathological science, a process by which the scientific process is distorted through wishful thinking or subjective bias
 Phytopathology, the study of abnormalities in plants
 Psychopathology, any illness of the mind
 Speech pathology, the area of rehabilitative medicine that treats of speech or swallowing impediments

Arts and works 
 Pathology (band), a death metal band
 Pathologic, a 2005 video game
 Pathology (film), a 2008 film
 The Pathologies, a 2005 Russian novel by Zakhar Prilepin

See also